The siege of Mytilene was a military investment of the city of Mytilene on the island of Lesbos in 81 BC. 

Mytilene, the capital city of the island of Lesbos in the Aegean Sea, revolted against Rome and was suspected of actively or tacitly aiding pirates in the region. Suetonius credits Marcus Minucius Thermus, the governor of the Roman Asia  province, with the victory, but the siege may have been conducted by or in coordination with Lucius Licinius Lucullus.

Julius Caesar began his military service during the siege after his pardon by Sulla during the proscriptions of 82 BC. It was during the siege that Caesar was awarded the Civic Crown, a considerable honour in the Roman military, which is a title awarded to a Roman soldier who saves the life of a fellow citizen.

References

80s BC conflicts
81 BC
Ancient Lesbos
Mytilene